The Battle of La Albarrada took place in the year 1858 in La Albarrada, at the time a colony of the city of Colima (in the state of Colima, Mexico), between elements of the liberal army during the War of Reform. The victory went to the conservative side that won the Juarist (liberal) defeat.

References

1858 in Mexico
Conflicts in 1858
Reform War